Nowruzabad (also Romanized as Nowrūzābād; also known as Nowrūzābād-e Tatar) is a village in Mirbag-e Shomali Rural District, in the Central District of Delfan County, Lorestan Province, Iran. During the 2006 census, its population was 35, or seven families.

References 

Towns and villages in Delfan County